Ed Leigh (born 15 July 1975) is a British sports presenter and commentator.

Broadcasting career
Ed Leigh is part of the presenting team for the BBC2 show Ski Sunday and regularly works for Red Bull TV on a host of live events from skateboarding and BMX, through to Enduro and mountain biking. He also worked with Whisper Films as the live anchor for Sail GP’s first two seasons of international coverage,. 

Probably best known as the BBC’s voice of action and adventure sports at the Olympics. Leigh has commentated on the winter games since 2006 and the summer games since 2012. 

Leigh got his first regular work on Channel 4's RTS award winning series Freesports On 4 covering action sports events around the world. Leigh has built up a diverse portfolio of work ranging from Ed vs. Spencer for Sky 1 to My Life As An Animal for BBC3.

Having worked as editor of Whitelines Snowboard Magazine, Leigh's TV career started presenting Trailer Park on Turners CNX channel CNX, alongside Christian Stevenson. 

After doing the voice over for the Extreme Sports Channel's Gumball 3000 series in 2004, he followed the Rally as a hitch hiker/presenter for 2005 and Gumball 2006: Around the world in 8 days.

In 2007, Leigh became co-presenter of the BBC's Ski Sunday series with Graham Bell after his commentary at the 2006 Winter Olympics helped bring the snowboarding to life: his memorable exclamation "Drama! Jacobellis is down!" at the comedic climax of the Women's Snowcross Final made his name. Leigh has commentated on snowboarding events at the all subsequent Winter Olympics.

Leigh presented a spin show from Ski Sunday, High Altitude, which ran for the winter of 2009 on BBC2, with Graham Bell.

During the 2012 Summer Olympics Ed commentated on Beach Volleyball for the BBC alongside Matt Chilton and also at the BMX event in the cycling.

Other appearances
In spring 2009, Leigh appeared on My Life as an Animal on BBC Three where he lived with dogs for a week.

Professional career
Previous to his broadcast career, Leigh's CV included professional snowboarding, journalism, event management, cleaning mega yachts and windsurf instructing. However in 1997, after a chance meeting in London, he centred his efforts on Laughing Gear, a commentary and cabaret company set up with friend Christian Stevenson.

Leigh started his snowboarding career working in Chalford based snowboard shop, Noahs Ark. After spending five years snowboarding in the resort of Val d'Isère a knee injury forced him to take a season off and he was offered a job as teaboy at White Lines snowboarding magazine, which he had been contributing to on a freelance basis. Six months later he was editor of the magazine which opened the doors to other media opportunities.

References

British television presenters
1975 births
Living people